was a Japanese ecologist and anthropologist. He was the founder of Kyoto University's Primate Research Institute and, together with Junichiro Itani, is considered one of the founders of Japanese primatology.

Early life and education 
Kinji Imanishi was born and raised in Kyoto, Japan.

He majored in biology and was awarded Doctor of Science in 1939 from Kyoto Imperial University. His doctoral dissertation was titled "Nihonkeiryu-San Kageroumoku" (日本渓流産蜉蝣目, Mayfly from the Japanese mountain streams).

Research
Imanishi and his students did foundational research on the behavior and social life of semi-wild horses and later of macaques, identifying individuals and making detailed observations on them over generations. This has led to important insights into animal culture. Imanishi introduced the Japanese term kaluchua which was later translated by Masao Kawai and others to refer to socially learned behaviors as "pre-culture".

In 1957, Imanishi founded the journal Primates, which is the oldest and longest-running international primatology journal in the world.

Imanishi's concept of species society is central to his views of the interconnectedness of things in nature. The world of species has been viewed as a social phenomenon, in which various individuals are continually contributing to the maintenance and perpetuation of the species society to which they belong.

Honours
From the Japanese Wikipedia
Asahi Prize (1968)
Person of Cultural Merit (3 November 1972)
Order of Culture (3 November 1979)
Grand Cordon of the Order of the Sacred Treasure (15 June 1992; posthumous) (Second Class: 29 April 1972)

Publications 
 Imanishi, Kinji (1941): Seibutsu no Sekai (生物の世界). Kōbundō
 Imanishi, Kinji (2002) The World of Living Things 
 Imanishi, Kinji (1966): Ningen Shakai no Keisei (人間社会の形成). NHK Books
 Imanishi, Kinji (1970): Watashi no Shinkaron (私の進化論). NHK Books
 Imanishi, Kinji (198p): Shutaisei no Shinkaron (主体性の進化論). Chūkō Shinsho

References 

1902 births
1992 deaths
20th-century Japanese zoologists
Japanese mammalogists
Academic staff of Kyoto University
Kyoto University alumni
Primatologists
Recipients of the Order of Culture
Recipients of the Order of the Sacred Treasure, 2nd class